was a Japanese television series.

Synopsis
Mochizuki Kotaro is a mild-mannered, unmanly high school student. One day, he visits a library and meets the mysterious librarian Himiko, who recommends to him an ancient book about a heroic general from the Sengoku period 400 years ago. Kotaro notices that he has the same name and age as the general described in the book, and he experiences a flashback. Kotaro later mentions the book to his father, who tells him that he may be the descendant of a powerful samurai. At that moment, Kotaro receives a message from his childhood friend Ai, telling him that their classmate Nakamura Tsuyoshi is in trouble. He rushes to the scene but does not have the courage to help, until another flashback transforms him into a samurai.

Cast
Haruma Miura as Mochizuki Kotaro
Yu Shirota as Nakamura Tsuyoshi
Anne Watanabe as Nagasawa Ai
Wakana Aoi as young Nagasawa Ai
Ohgo Suzuka as Mochizuki Yuna
Ryoko Kobayashi as Minami Yurika
Dori Sakurada
Tomo Yanagishita as Wada Daisuke
Aoi Nakabeppu
Mikako Ichikawa as Miki Sayaka
Saki Matsuda as Kisaragi Hidemi
Nobuaki Kaneko as Motoyama Hiroshi
Akio Kaneda
Midoriko Kimura
Mimura as Watanuki Himiko
Shigeru Muroi as Kamei Kyoko
Goro Kishitani as Mochizuki Shinji

Production credits 
Screenwriter: Yumiko Inoue.
Chief producer: Yuko Hazeyama.
Producer: Tetsuhiro Ogino, Masahiro Uchiyama.
Directors: Toya Sato, Ryuichi Inomata.
Music: Yugo Kanno.

References

External links
 Webpage at NTV.

Japanese drama television series
Japanese high school television series
Nippon TV dramas
2009 Japanese television series debuts
2009 Japanese television series endings
Television series about teenagers
Television shows written by Yumiko Inoue